"You're So Fine" is a 1953 song, and 1954 chart hit by Little Walter. The song has been covered by Little Mack Simmons and other artists.

References

1953 songs
Little Walter songs
Checker Records singles